PC Extreme was a computer magazine published in the UK by Live Publishing International Ltd.

It focussed on modding, overclocking, hardware, hacking (primarily in the technical, rather than the cracking, sense) and video games.

It appeared in December 2002, and was published monthly until August 2005. At that point it was suspended, shortly after which the publishing company went into administration.

References

2002 establishments in the United Kingdom
2005 disestablishments in the United Kingdom
Monthly magazines published in the United Kingdom
Defunct computer magazines published in the United Kingdom
Magazines established in 2002
Magazines disestablished in 2005